Tuifuisaʻa Patila Malua Amosa is a Samoan oceanographer. She is Dean of Sciences at the National University of Samoa.

Amosa was educated at Flinders University in Australia and the University of Otago in New Zealand, graduating with an MSc in Environmental Science in 2007 and a PhD in Chemistry in 2015. Her PhD was on ocean acidification.

She has taught at the National University of Samoa for over 25 years. In July 2021 she was promoted to senior lecturer in recognition of her regional research leadership in climate change.

References

Living people
Samoan women scientists
Flinders University alumni
University of Otago alumni
Academic staff of the National University of Samoa
Year of birth missing (living people)